The de Havilland Canada DHC-6 Twin Otter is a Canadian STOL (Short Takeoff and Landing) utility aircraft developed by de Havilland Canada, which produced the aircraft from 1965 to 1988; Viking Air purchased the type certificate, then restarted production in 2008 before re-adopting the DHC name in 2022. The aircraft's fixed tricycle undercarriage, STOL capabilities, twin turboprop engines and high rate of climb have made it a successful commuter airliner, typically seating 18–20 passengers, as well as a cargo and medical evacuation aircraft. In addition, the Twin Otter has been popular with commercial skydiving operations, and is used by the United States Army Parachute Team and the 98th Flying Training Squadron of the United States Air Force.

Design and development

Development of the aircraft began in 1964, with the first flight on 20 May 1965. A twin-engine replacement for the single-engine DHC-3 Otter retaining DHC's STOL qualities, its design features included double-slotted trailing-edge flaps and ailerons that work in unison with the flaps to boost STOL performance. The availability of the  Pratt & Whitney Canada PT6A-20 turboprop in the early 1960s made the concept of a twin more feasible. A DHC-3 Otter with its piston engine replaced with two PT6A-4 engines had already flown in 1963. It had been extensively modified for STOL research. To bush plane operators, the improved reliability of turboprop power and the improved performance of a twin-engine configuration made it an immediately popular alternative to the piston-powered Otter which had been flying since 1951.

The first six aircraft produced were designated Series 1, indicating that they were prototype aircraft. The initial production run consisted of Series 100 aircraft, serial numbers seven to 115 inclusive. In 1968, Series 200 production began with serial number 116. Changes made at the beginning of Series 200 production included improving the STOL performance, adding a longer nose that was equipped with a larger baggage compartment (except for aircraft fitted with floats), and fitting a larger door to the rear baggage compartment. All Series 1, 100, and 200 aircraft and their variants (110, 210) were fitted with the  PT6A-20 engines.

In 1969, the Series 300 was introduced, beginning with serial number 231. Both aircraft performance and payload were improved by fitting more powerful PT6A-27 engines. The Series 300 proved to be the most successful variant by far, with 614 Series 300 aircraft and their subvariants (Series 310 for United Kingdom operators, Series 320 for Australian operators, etc.) sold before production in Toronto by de Havilland Canada ended in 1988.

In 1972, its unit cost was US$680,000,
In 1976, a new -300 would have cost $700,000 ($ million 31 years later) and is still worth more than $2.5 million in 2018 despite the -400 introduction, many years after the -300 production ceased.

New production

After Series 300 production ended, the remaining tooling was purchased by Viking Air of Victoria, British Columbia, which manufactures replacement parts for all of the out-of-production de Havilland Canada aircraft. On 24 February 2006, Viking purchased the type certificates from Bombardier Aviation for all the out-of-production de Havilland Canada aircraft (DHC-1 through DHC-7). The ownership of the certificates gives Viking the exclusive right to manufacture new aircraft.

On 17 July 2006, at the Farnborough Airshow, Viking Air announced its intention to offer a Series 400 Twin Otter. On 2 April 2007, Viking announced that with 27 orders and options in hand, it was restarting production of the Twin Otter, equipped with more powerful Pratt & Whitney Canada PT6A-34 engines. As of November 2007, 40 firm orders and 10 options had been taken and a new final assembly plant was established in Calgary, Alberta. Zimex Aviation of Switzerland received the first new production aircraft, serial number 845, in July 2010. By mid-2014, Viking had built 55 new aircraft at its Calgary facility. The production rate as of summer 2014 was about 24 aircraft per year. In April 2015, Viking announced a reduction of the production rate to 18 aircraft per year. On 17 June 2015, Viking further announced a partnership with a Chinese firm, Reignwood Aviation Group. The group will purchase 50 aircraft and become the exclusive representatives for new Series 400 Twin Otters in China.

Major changes introduced with the Series 400 include Honeywell Primus Apex fully integrated avionics, deletion of the AC electrical system, deletion of the beta backup system, modernization of the electrical and lighting systems, and use of composites for non load-bearing structures such as doors.

The 100th Series 400 Twin Otter (MSN 944) was displayed at the July 2017 EAA AirVenture Oshkosh. Currently, 38% are operated as regional airliners, 31% in military aviation or special missions, 26% in industrial support and 5% in private air charter. Additionally, 70 are on regular landing gear wheels, 18 are configured as straight or amphibious floatplanes, 10 have tundra tires and 2 have wheel skis.

In 2019, Viking started making plastic components for the Twin Otter by 3D printer to help reduce cost.

In 2021, its equipped price was $6.5M.

Twin Otter production was suspended in 2019 during the COVID-19 pandemic. In July 2022, DHC announced that it was reviewing the program and supply chain, with a decision on when to resume production expected "in the near future".

Operational history

Twin Otters could be delivered directly from the factory with floats, skis, or tricycle landing gear fittings, making them adaptable bush planes for remote and northern areas. Areas including Canada and the United States, (specifically Alaska) had much of the demand. Many Twin Otters still serve in the Arctic and subarctic, but they can also be found in Africa, Australia, Asia, Antarctica, and other regions where bush planes are the optimum means of travel. Their versatility and manoeuvrability have made them popular in areas with difficult flying environments such as Papua New Guinea. In Norway, the Twin Otter paved the way for the network of short-field airports, connecting rural areas with larger towns. The Twin Otter showed outstanding reliability, and remained in service until 2000 on certain routes. Widerøe of Norway was, at one time, the world's largest operator of Twin Otters. During one period of its tenure in Norway, the Twin Otter fleet achieved over 96,000 cycles (take-off, flight, and landing) per year.

A number of commuter airlines in the United States got their start by operating Twin Otters in scheduled passenger operations. Houston Metro Airlines (which later changed its name to Metro Airlines) constructed their own STOLport airstrip with a passenger terminal and maintenance hangar in Clear Lake City, Texas, near the Johnson Space Center. The Clear Lake City STOLport was specifically designed for Twin Otter operations. According to the February 1976 edition of the Official Airline Guide, Houston Metro operated 22 round-trip flights every weekday at this time between Clear Lake City (CLC) and Houston Intercontinental Airport, now George Bush Intercontinental Airport, in a scheduled passenger airline shuttle operation. Houston Metro had agreements in place for connecting passenger feed services with Continental Airlines and Eastern Air Lines at Houston Intercontinental, with this major airport having a dedicated STOL landing area at the time specifically for Twin Otter flight operations. The Clear Lake City STOLport is no longer in existence.

The Walt Disney World resort in Florida was also served with scheduled airline flights operated with Twin Otter aircraft. The Walt Disney World Airport, also known as the Lake Buena Vista STOLport, was a private airfield constructed by The Walt Disney Company with Twin Otter operations in mind. In the early 1970s, Shawnee Airlines operated scheduled Twin Otter flights between the Disney resort and nearby Orlando Jetport, now Orlando International Airport, as well as to Tampa International Airport. This service by Shawnee Airlines is mentioned in the "Air Commuter Section" of the 6 September 1972 Eastern Air Lines system timetable as a connecting service to and from Eastern flights. This STOL airfield is no longer in use.

Another commuter airline in the United States, Rocky Mountain Airways, operated Twin Otters from the Lake County Airport in Leadville, Colorado. Rocky Mountain Airways went on to become the worldwide launch customer for the larger, four-engine de Havilland Canada Dash 7 STOL turboprop, but continued to operate the Twin Otter, as well.

Larger scheduled passenger airlines based in the United States, Canada, Mexico, the Caribbean and Australia, particularly jetliner operators, also flew Twin Otters, with the aircraft providing connecting feeder service for these airlines. Jet aircraft operators which also flew the Twin Otter included Aeronaves de Mexico, Air BC, Alaska Airlines, ALM Antillean Airlines, Ansett Airlines, Cayman Airways, Frontier Airlines, LIAT, Norcanair, Nordair, Ozark Air Lines, Pacific Western Airlines, Quebecair, South Pacific Island Airways, Time Air, Transair, Trans Australia Airlines (TAA), Wardair and Wien Air Alaska. In many cases, the excellent operating economics of the Twin Otter allowed airlines large and small to provide scheduled passenger flights to communities that most likely would otherwise never have received air service.

Twin Otters are also a staple of Antarctic transportation. Four Twin Otters are employed by the British Antarctic Survey on research and supply flights, and several are employed by the United States Antarctic Program via contract with Kenn Borek Air. On 24–25 April 2001, two Twin Otters performed the first winter flight to Amundsen–Scott South Pole Station to perform a medical evacuation.

On 21–22 June 2016, Kenn Borek Air's Twin Otters performed the third winter evacuation flight to Amundsen–Scott South Pole Station to remove two people for medical reasons.

The Argentine Air Force has used the Twin Otter in Antarctica since the 1970s, with at least one of them deployed year-round at Marambio Base. The Chilean Air Force has operated the type since 1980, usually having an example based at Presidente Frei Antarctic base of the South Shetland Islands.

As of August 2006, a total of 584 Twin Otter aircraft (all variants) remained in service worldwide. Major operators at the time included: Libyan Arab Airlines, Maldivian Air Taxi, Trans Maldivian Airways, Kenn Borek Air, and Grand Canyon Scenic Airlines. Some 115 airlines operated smaller numbers of the aircraft including Yeti Airlines in Nepal, Malaysia Airlines (which used the Twin Otter exclusively for passenger and freight transportation to the Kelabit Highlands region in Sarawak), and in the United Kingdom, the Scottish airline, Loganair which uses the aircraft to service the island of Barra in the Outer Hebrides. This daily scheduled service is unique as the aircraft lands on the beach and the schedule is partly influenced by the tide tables. Trials at Barra Airport with heavier planes than the Twin Otter, like the Short 360, failed because they sank in the sand. The Twin Otter is also used for landing at Juancho E. Yrausquin Airport, the world's shortest commercial runway, on the Caribbean island of Saba, Netherlands Antilles.

The Twin Otter has been popular with commercial skydiving operations. The United States Air Force operates three Twin Otters for the United States Air Force Academy's skydiving team.

On 26 April 2001, the first ever air rescue during polar winter from the South Pole occurred with a ski-equipped Twin Otter operated by Kenn Borek Air.

On 25 September 2008, the Series 400 Technology Demonstrator achieved "power on" status in advance of an official rollout. The first flight of the Series 400 technical demonstrator, C-FDHT, took place 1 October 2008, at Victoria International Airport.

Two days later, the aircraft departed Victoria, British Columbia for a ferry flight to Orlando, Florida, site of the 2008 National Business Aviation Association (NBAA) Conference and exhibition. The first new build Series 400 Twin Otter (SN 845) made its first flight on 16 February 2010, in Calgary, Alberta. Transport Canada presented Viking Air Limited with an amended DHC-6 Type Certificate including the Series 400 on 21 July 2010. Six years after, in July 2016, 100 series 400 have been delivered to 34 customers operating in 29 countries.

In June 2017, 125 have been made since restarting production in 2010.

Variants

  Twin-engine STOL utility transport aircraft, powered by two  Pratt & Whitney PT6A-20 turboprop engines.
DHC-6 Series 110  Variant of the Series 100 built to conform to BCAR (British Civil Air Regulations).
  Improved version.
  Twin-engine STOL utility transport aircraft, powered by two  (715 ESHP) Pratt & Whitney Canada PT6A-27 turboprop engines.
DHC-6 Series 300M  Multi-role military transport aircraft. Two of these were produced as "proof-of-concept" demonstrators. Both have since been reverted to Series 300 conformity.
  Variant of the Series 300 built to conform to BCAR (British Civil Air Regulations).
DHC-6 Series 320  Variant of the Series 300 built to conform to Australian Civil Air Regulations.
DHC-6 Series 300S  Six demonstrator aircraft fitted with eleven seats, wing spoilers and an anti-skid braking system. All have since been reverted to Series 300 conformity.

Viking Air production, first delivered in July 2010, powered by two Pratt & Whitney Canada PT6A-34 engines, and available on standard landing gear, straight floats, amphibious floats, skis, wheel skis, or intermediate flotation landing gear ("tundra tires").
Viking Air DHC-6 Series 400S Seaplane
 Viking Air seventeen-seat seaplane version of the Series 400 with twin floats and corrosion-resistance measures for the airframe, engines and fuels system. Customer deliveries planned from early 2017.  lighter than the 400.
  Twin-engine STOL utility transport, search and rescue aircraft for the Canadian Armed Forces Search and Rescue operations. Based on the Series 300 aircraft.
UV-18A  Twin-engine STOL utility transport aircraft for the Alaska National Guard. Six built. It has been replaced by the Short C-23 Sherpa in United States Army service. In 2019 the United States Naval Research Laboratory added a UV-18A to the Scientific Development Squadron One (VXS-1) inventory.
UV-18B  Parachute training aircraft for the United States Air Force Academy. The United States Air Force Academy's 98th Flying Training Squadron maintains three UV-18s in its inventory as free-fall parachuting training aircraft, and by the Academy Parachute Team, the Wings of Blue, for year-round parachuting operations. Based on the Series 300 aircraft.
UV-18C  United States Army designation for three Viking Air Series 400s delivered in 2013.

Operators

In 2016, there were 281 Twin Otters in airline service with 26 new aircraft on order: 112 in North/South America, 106 in Asia Pacific and Middle East (16 orders), 38 in Europe (10 orders) and 25 in Africa.

In 2018, a total of 270 Twin Otters were in airline service, and 14 on order: 111 in North/South America, 117 in the Asia Pacific and Middle East (14 orders), 26 in Europe and 13 in Africa. 

In 2020, there were a total of 315 Twin Otters worldwide with 220 in service, 95 in storage and 8 on order. By region there were 22 in Africa, 142 in Asia Pacific (8 orders), 37 in Europe, 4 in the Middle East and 110 in the Americas.

The Twin Otter has been popular not only with bush operators as a replacement for the single-engine de Havilland Canada DHC-3 Otter but also with other civil and military customers, with over 890 aircraft built. Many commuter airlines in the United States got their start by flying the Twin Otter in scheduled passenger operations.

Accidents and incidents

Specifications

Table notes

See also

References

Notes

Bibliography

 Hotson, Fred W. The de Havilland Canada Story. Toronto: CANAV Books, 1983. .
 Rossiter, Sean. Otter & Twin Otter: The Universal Airplanes. Vancouver: Douglas & McIntyre, 1998. .

External links

 de Havilland DHC-6 Twin Otter website by Neil Aird
 de Havilland DHC-6 Twin Otter blog by Erik Johannesson
 

 
DHC-6
DHC-6
1960s Canadian civil utility aircraft
1960s Canadian military utility aircraft
High-wing aircraft
Articles containing video clips
STOL aircraft
Aircraft first flown in 1965
Twin-turboprop tractor aircraft